Pumpkin pie spice, also known as pumpkin spice, is an American spice mix commonly used as a flavoring for pumpkin pie, but does not include pumpkin as an ingredient.

Pumpkin pie spice is similar to the British and Commonwealth mixed spice. It is generally a blend of ground cinnamon, nutmeg, ginger, cloves, and sometimes allspice. It can also be used as a seasoning in general cooking.

As of 2016, pumpkin spice consumables produce $500 million in annual sales. The spice is often referred to in the context of a Pumpkin Spice Latte from Starbucks, with the company selling more than 200 million lattes between its launch and 2013, generating revenue of at least $80 million a year.

History
A "Pompkin" recipe calling for a similar spice mix (mace, nutmeg and ginger) can be found as far back as 1796 in the first known published American cookbook, American Cookery, written by Amelia Simmons:
Pompkin

No. 1. One quart stewed and strained, 3 pints cream, 9 beaten eggs, sugar, mace, nutmeg and ginger, laid into paste No. 7 or 3, and with a dough spur, cross and chequer it, and baked in dishes three quarters of an hour.

No. 2. One quart of milk, 1 pint pompkin, 4 eggs, molasses, allspice and ginger in a crust, bake 1 hour.

Pumpkin pie spice has been mentioned in cookbooks dating to the 1890s.

Blended pumpkin pie spice was introduced commercially by McCormick & Company in 1934. and is now commercialized by many companies.

The American coffee chain Starbucks developed a Pumpkin Spice Latte in January 2003, adding it to a range of seasonal winter drinks.  Starbucks' director of espresso Americas, Peter Dukes, said that "developers realized there was something special around the pumpkin flavor, especially since there wasn't anything around pumpkin at the time". The company experimented with different combinations and ratios of pumpkin to spice, ultimately deciding on a recipe with no pumpkin in it. It became Starbucks' most popular seasonal beverage.

See also
 Pumpkin Spice Spam
 Five-spice powder

References

Herb and spice mixtures
American cuisine